Mark Daniel Gangloff (born June 8, 1982) is an American former competition swimmer, Olympic gold medalist, world champion, and former world record-holder.

Gangloff represented the United States at two consecutive Summer Olympics.  At the 2004 Summer Olympics in Athens, he earned a gold medal by swimming for the winning U.S. team in the preliminary heats of the 4×100-meter medley relay.  In individual competition, he placed fourth in the men's 100-meter breaststroke.  Four years later at the 2008 Summer Olympics in Beijing, he again participated in his signature event, the 100-meter breaststroke, and placed eighth in the event final.

Gangloff broke the American record in the 100-meter breaststroke with a time of 59.01 at the U.S. Swimming National Championships in 2009.

He attended Firestone High School in Akron, Ohio.  He accepted an athletic scholarship to attend Auburn University, where he swam for the Auburn Tigers swimming and diving team in NCAA competition from 2001 to 2005.  He graduated from Auburn in 2005 with a bachelor's degree in criminology.  Gangloff appeared in the 2006 movie The Guardian.

See also
 List of Auburn University people
 List of Olympic medalists in swimming (men)
 List of World Aquatics Championships medalists in swimming (men)
 World record progression 4 × 100 metres medley relay

References

External links
 
  (archive)
 
 
 
 Mark Gangloff fact sheet  at Arluck Promotions
 2007 Q&A with Mark Gangloff
 

1982 births
Living people
American male breaststroke swimmers
Auburn Tigers men's swimmers
World record setters in swimming
Medalists at the 2004 Summer Olympics
Medalists at the 2008 Summer Olympics
Medalists at the FINA World Swimming Championships (25 m)
Olympic gold medalists for the United States in swimming
Sportspeople from Buffalo, New York
Swimmers from Akron, Ohio
Swimmers at the 1999 Pan American Games
Swimmers at the 2003 Pan American Games
Swimmers at the 2004 Summer Olympics
Swimmers at the 2007 Pan American Games
Swimmers at the 2008 Summer Olympics
World Aquatics Championships medalists in swimming
Pan American Games gold medalists for the United States
Pan American Games bronze medalists for the United States
Pan American Games medalists in swimming
Medalists at the 1999 Pan American Games
Medalists at the 2003 Pan American Games
Medalists at the 2007 Pan American Games